Gabriel Abdala Zakuani (born 31 May 1986) is a Congolese retired professional footballer who played as a defender. He was most recently manager of Spalding United.

Zakuani began his career with Leyton Orient, and was a vital member of the side which gained promotion in 2005–06 and also knocked Premier League side Fulham out of the FA Cup. He was signed by Fulham in August 2006, but failed to make an impact at Craven Cottage, spending half the 2006–07 season and the whole of the 2007–08 season on loan at Stoke City, with whom he helped gain promotion to the Premier League.

He signed for Peterborough United in 2008–09, initially on loan, before making the move permanent. With the "Posh" Zakuani gained promotion in 2008–09 but were then relegated in 2009–10. They gained an instant return by beating Huddersfield Town 3–0 in the 2011 League One play-off final. After spending two seasons in the Championship, Peterborough suffered relegation at the end of the 2012–13 season. In January 2014, Zakuani decided to join Superleague Greece side Kalloni. He returned, however, to Peterborough in June 2014.

Club career

Leyton Orient
Born in Kinshasa, Zakuani moved to London as a young child. Leyton Orient spotted him playing in one of his school matches as a 14-year old and signed him. After two seasons in Orient's youth team, Zakuani was given his first-team debut against AFC Bournemouth in March 2003, aged 16. In the 2004–05 and 2005–06 seasons, he became a regular in Martin Ling's plans, making the central defence position his own and scoring three goals in almost 100 first team appearances for Orient.

In January 2006, Zakuani was part of the Leyton Orient side that defeated Premier League, Fulham 2–1 in the FA Cup third round. His performance attracted the attention of the West London side, who signed him in July that year for a fee of £1 million, rising to £1.5 million depending on appearances, on a four-year contract. The fee represented a club record for Leyton Orient.

Fulham
Zakuani only played twice for Fulham in his three-year spell with the club, in the League Cup against Wycombe Wanderers and in the FA Cup against Leicester City.

Loans to Stoke City
Zakuani signed for Stoke City on loan for the remainder of the 2006–07 season. Despite being a centre back, Zakuani also deputised as a right-back during his loan spell. He made his debut for Stoke in a 2–0 win away at Derby County in February 2007. He went on to make another eight appearances for Stoke during the 2006–07 season as City narrowly missed out on a play-off place.

On 31 August 2007, Zakuani re-signed for Stoke on loan for the rest of the 2007–08 season. This time he made 19 appearances as Stoke were promoted to the Premier League. Zakuani later admitted he would like to make a permanent move to Stoke: "The gaffer [Tony Pulis] said he'd like me here so I'll wait and see what happens in the summer. Obviously Stoke would be my first choice but you always think where you will be wanted the most." Despite this, a move never happened.

Peterborough United
Gabriel Zakuani was then sent to Peterborough United on a three-month loan. On 25 November 2008, it was confirmed that he would make his loan move permanent when the transfer window re-opened on 1 January 2009, for a fee in the region of £375,000.

On 8 July 2012, Zakuani was given captaincy of Peterborough United, where he would succeed Grant McCann. On 12 November 2012, he was transfer listed and fined following a breach of club discipline following a night out in Peterborough. Zakuani wrote on Twitter, explaining: "I went out on a weekend whether there's no midweek game, those that know me know I don't drink or smoke, I was up at 8am for church the next day." He was later taken off the transfer list and had his fine repealed. As a result of not being transfer list, Zakuani was available for the next match. Zakuani says the incident changed his attitude, and he vowed to stay behind more in training.

At the end of the 2012–13 season, which resulted in Peterborough United relegation, Zakuani was placed on the transfer list for the second time after rejecting a three-year contract with the club, due to his increasing international commitment.

Kalloni
On 2 January 2014, Zakuani signed a contract with Kalloni, who are competing in Superleague Greece, the top flight of Greek football.

Return to Peterborough United
On 8 June 2014, Zakuani made a return to Peterborough, signing a two-year contract stating: "I missed the club and this feels like a homecoming. I feel like there is unfinished business here. I want to get this club back to the Championship."

Northampton Town
Zakuani signed for Northampton Town in June 2016. He scored his first goal for Northampton in a 4–2 win at Shrewsbury Town on 22 October 2016.

Gillingham 
Zakuani signed for League One side Gillingham on a one-year deal on 7 June 2017, after rejecting a new contract offer from Northampton Town. He made his full debut in the 0–0 draw away to Doncaster Rovers on the opening day of the 2017–18 League One season.

He was offered a new contract by Gillingham at the end of the 2017–18 season. He left the club in September 2019 when his contract was terminated. At the time he had not played a game for seven months due to injury.

Swindon Town
On 4 October 2019, Zakuani signed a short-term contract with Swindon Town following a long-term injury to club captain Dion Conroy. He made his first appearance the following day in a 2–1 defeat at Bradford City. Zakuani was released in January 2020 after his short-term deal expired.

Dagenham & Redbridge
On 13 January 2020, Zakuani signed for National League club Dagenham & Redbridge on a six-month deal. He made one appearance for the Daggers before the season was cut short due to Covid-19 and subsequently retired from the game in September 2020.

International career
He retired from international duty in September 2018, having made 29 appearances since making his debut in 2013.

Coaching career
In October 2020 Zakuani was appointed joint caretaker manager of Spalding United alongside Neal Spafford and was later given the job on a permanent basis with Spafford as his assistant and Lomana LuaLua to be brought in as an attacking coach.

In November 2021 he stepped down from the role due to due to his increased business and media commitments.

Personal life
His brother Steve is a former professional footballer who came through the Arsenal academy, before playing collegiate soccer with the Akron Zips and for the Cleveland Internationals of the USL Premier Development League. He then graduated to Major League Soccer and played for Seattle Sounders FC and Portland Timbers before retiring, citing injuries. In 2007, Zakuani appeared in Dizzee Rascal's music video for his single "Flex".

Career statistics

Club

International

Honours
 Leyton Orient
 Football League Two third-place promotion: 2005–06

 Stoke City
 Football League Championship runner-up: 2007–08

 Peterborough United
 Football League One runner-up: 2008–09
 Football League One play-offs final winner: 2011

References

External links

1986 births
Living people
Footballers from Kinshasa
English sportspeople of Democratic Republic of the Congo descent
Democratic Republic of the Congo footballers
Democratic Republic of the Congo international footballers
Democratic Republic of the Congo expatriate footballers
Expatriate footballers in England
Expatriate footballers in Greece
Association football defenders
Leyton Orient F.C. players
Fulham F.C. players
Stoke City F.C. players
Peterborough United F.C. players
Northampton Town F.C. players
Gillingham F.C. players
Swindon Town F.C. players
Dagenham & Redbridge F.C. players
English Football League players
Super League Greece players
2013 Africa Cup of Nations players
2015 Africa Cup of Nations players
2017 Africa Cup of Nations players
Spalding United F.C. managers